= Vladimir Kolobov =

Vladimir Kolobov is a Technical Fellow at CFD Research Corporation, Principal Research Scientist at the Center Of Space Plasma and Aeronomic Research at University of Alabama in Huntsville, USA. He obtained his PhD degree in 1989 from St. Petersburg University in Russia. He was a visiting scientist at Universite P. Sabatier, in Toulouse, France, the University of Wisconsin in Madison, and the University of Houston, USA.

Since joining CFDRC in 1997, he has been responsible for developing computational tools for various applications from material processing to aerospace and nanoscience. His work promoted the widespread use of computer simulations in modern plasma technologies. Dr. Kolobov has made distinctive contributions to the advancements of plasma science and its industrial applications. He developed the kinetic theory of collisional plasma that explained the nature of electric field reversals in the cathode region of DC discharges, collisionless electron heating, and the anomalous skin effect in low-pressure inductively coupled plasma sources. He was named a Fellow of the Institute of Electrical and Electronics Engineers (IEEE) in 2016 for his contributions to the theory and simulation of, and software development for, industrial plasma.
